The 2018 Royal London One-Day Cup tournament was a limited overs cricket competition that formed part of the 2018 domestic cricket season in England and Wales. Matches were contested over 50 overs per side and have List A cricket status. All 18 first-class counties competed in the tournament, which ran from the middle of May until the end of June, when the final took place at Lord's. Nottinghamshire were the defending champions of the tournament, having beaten Surrey in 2017 final.

Format
The competition featured two groups of nine teams, based on a rough North–South geographical split. Each team played eight matches during the group stage, playing every other member of their group once, with four matches at home and four away. The group stage took place from the middle of May to the beginning of June, with the group winners progressing straight to the semi-finals and the second and third placed teams in each group playing a play-off against a team from the other group with the winner progressing to one of the semi-final matches. The only change for the 2018 competition from 2017 is the quarter-finals stage is renamed as the play-offs.

North Group

Table

Fixtures

May

June

South Group

Table

Fixtures

May

June

Knockout stage
The winner of each group progressed straight to the semi-finals with the second and third placed teams playing a play-off match against a team from the other group which made up the play-offs. The winner of each play-off played one of the group winners in the semi-finals. The final took place at Lord's on 30 June 2018, with Hampshire defeating Kent Spitfires by 61 runs.

Play-offs

Semi-finals

Final

Statistics

Highest score by a team

Lowest score by a team

Top score by an individual

Best bowling figures by an individual

Most runs

 — Source: ESPN Cricinfo

Most wickets

 — Source: ESPN Cricinfo

References

2018 in English cricket
Royal London One-Day Cup
Royal London One-Day Cup